Information Technology Security Assessment (IT Security Assessment) is an explicit study to locate IT security vulnerabilities and risks.

Background
In an assessment, the assessor should have the full cooperation of the organization being assessed. The organization grants access to its facilities, provides network access, outlines detailed information about the network, etc. All parties understand that the goal is to study security and identify improvements to secure the systems. An assessment for security is potentially the most useful of all security tests.

Purpose of security assessment
The goal of a security assessment (also known as a security audit, security review, or network assessment), is
to ensure that necessary security controls are integrated into the design and implementation of a project. A properly completed security assessment should provide documentation outlining any security gaps between a project design and approved corporate security policies. Management can address security gaps in three ways:
Management can decide to cancel the project, allocate the necessary resources to correct
the security gaps, or accept the risk based on an informed risk / reward analysis.

Methodology
The following methodology outline is put forward as the effective means in conducting security assessment.
 Requirement Study and Situation Analysis
 Security policy creation and update
 Document Review
Risk Analysis
 Vulnerability Scan
Data Analysis
 Report & Briefing

Sample report
A security assessment report should include the following information:
 Introduction/background information
 Executive and Management summary
 Assessment scope and objectives
 Assumptions and limitations
 Methods and assessment tools used
 Current environment or system description with network diagrams, if any
 Security requirements
 Summary of findings and recommendations
 The general control review result
 The vulnerability test results
 Risk assessment results including identified assets, threats, vulnerabilities, impact and likelihood assessment, and the risk results analysis
 Recommended safeguards

Criticisms and shortcomings
IT security risk assessments like many risk assessments in IT, are not actually quantitative and do not represent risk in any actuarially-sound manner.  Measuring risk quantitatively can have a significant impact on prioritizing risks and getting investment approval.

Quantitative risk analysis has been applied to IT security in a major US government study in 2000.  The Federal CIO Council commissioned a study of the $100 million IT security investment for the Department of Veterans Affairs with results shown quantitatively. United States Department of Veterans Affairs

Professional certifications
There are common vendor-neutral professional certifications for performing security assessment.
CISSP
 CCSP
 CISM
 CISA
 ISO/IEC 27001:2013 Auditor/Lead Auditor
 CRISC
 QSA/ISA

Automated Security Assessment Tools
There are common tools for automatic security assessment for self/third party usage.
 Findings
 Panorays
 RapidFire Tools
 Beyond Security
 Veracode
 RiskWatch
 SolarWinds

External links 
ISC2
Information Systems Audit and Control Association
SANS Institute

References

Casas III, Victoriano. 2006. "An Information Security Risk Assessment Model for Public and University Administrators." Applied Research Project. Texas State University. http://ecommons.txstate.edu/arp/109/

Computer security accreditations